Bacho may refer to:

 Bacho Akhalaia (born 1980), Georgian politician 
 Bacho District, Thailand
 Bacho Kiro cave
 Bacho Kiro High School
 Bacho Kiro Peak
 Bacho Kiro (1835–1876), revolutionary
 BACHO record format
 Peter Bacho, writer

See also
 Bachos, France
 Bahco, a Swedish hand tool brand